Events from the year 1832 in Sweden

Incumbents
 Monarch – Charles XIV John

Events

 26 September - Inauguration of the Göta Canal.
 The trade with meat, bread and drink is liberalized in 37 Swedish cities.  
 First issue of the Göteborgs Handels- och Sjöfartstidning

Births
 23 January - Charlotte Pousette, stage actress (died 1877) 
 17 July - August Söderman, composer (died 1876) 
 3 October - Lina Sandell, writer (died 1903) 
 12 November - Nancy Edberg, pioneer swimmer (died 1892) 
 18 November - Adolf Erik Nordenskiöld, Arctic explorer (died 1901) 
 4 October - Thorborg Rappe, pioneer in the education of students with Intellectual disability (died 1902)
 Amanda Rylander, actress (died 1920)

Deaths

 22 February - Charlotta Cederström, artist  (born 1760) 
 Hedvig Ulrika De la Gardie, courtier (born 1761)

References

 
Years of the 19th century in Sweden
Sweden